Puerto Bermejo  is a village and municipality in Chaco Province in northern Argentina.

Notable people
Rodolfo Almirón, a former police officer and a leader of an extreme right-wing death squad known as the Triple A.

References

Populated places in Chaco Province